"You'll Never Know What You're Missing" was the third minor hit for The Real Thing who already had had two major hits with "You to Me Are Everything" and "Can't Get By Without You"

Background
The song was written by Chris and Eddie Amoo. It was produced by Chris, Eddie and Dennis Weinreich for Tony Hall productions. The strings were arranged by Paul Buckmeister. The B side of the single was Love Is A Playgoun, also written by the Amoo's. They also co-produced it with Dennis Weinreich, and the strings and brass were arranged by Ian Green.

British chart history
For the week ending 27 February 1977 the single had jumped from no 48 to no 31 in the British charts. For the week ending 19 March the single had jumped from 25 to 20. By 26 March the single had dropped down a couple of notches to no 23. Billboard recorded that on the week ending 9 April 1977 the single had climbed from no 21 to no 16, which is where it peaked.

References

1976 songs
1976 singles
Pye Records singles
The Real Thing (British band) songs